Below are the names and numbers of the steam locomotives that comprised the LNER Gresley Classes A1 and A3, that ran on the Great Northern (GNR) and latterly the London and North Eastern Railway network. They represented Nigel Gresley's attempt to standardise steam design. The class names mainly denoted various racehorses; there were seven exceptions, detailed at the end.

Nos. 4470–81 were ordered by the GNR as their nos. 1470–81; and although only the first two were actually delivered to the GNR, all twelve initially bore their GNR numbers, a distinguishing suffix letter "N" being added to the last two from new, and to five others from August 1923, i.e. 1480N, etc. These twelve all had their numbers increased by 3000 between February 1924 and April 1925.

Fleet list

Non-racehorse names
GNR no. 1470 was named Great Northern when new in April 1922 in honour of the Great Northern Railway, which was to lose its identity at the end of the year; similarly, GNR no. 1471 was named Sir Frederick Banbury in September 1922, in honour of the final Chairman of the GNR. The first Chairman of the LNER was honoured in the same way in 1924 when LNER no. 2563 was named William Whitelaw.

The year 1925 was the centenary of the Stockton and Darlington Railway, an LNER ancestor, and the first A1 built at Doncaster in that year, no. 2555, was accordingly named Centenary.

No. 2579 was named Dick Turpin, but there was no distinguished racehorse of this name; the name refers to the well-known highwayman. Subsequently, a racehorse named Dick Turpin won the 1933 Chester Cup. However, this horse was foaled 5 years after the locomotive sharing its name was constructed.

No. 2553 was renamed Prince of Wales on 11 November 1926 following the visit of the future King Edward VIII to Doncaster Works a few days earlier; no. 2553 was one of the locomotives he had inspected there.

No. 2564 was named Knight of the Thistle after the racehorse owned by Mr H. McCalmont which won the 1897 Royal Hunt Cup. On 28 December 1932, whilst the locomotive was in Doncaster Works for general repair, new nameplates were fitted reading Knight of Thistle, which was meaningless both for the order and for the racehorse.

Notes

References

 LNER encyclopaedia
 Pedigree Online Thoroughbred Database
 ABC of British Railway locomotives, (1959). Ian Allan Limited

A3 list
4-6-2 locomotives
Railway locomotives introduced in 1922
Lner Class A1 A3 Locomotives